D5 or Yaroslavsko-Paveletsky Diameter is the fifth line of the Moscow Central Diameters which will open in the future. The line will consist of 48 stations with two branches (Fryazino and Schyolkovo branch) with the Fryazino branch railway upgrade already underway. Although many routes were proposed for D5 in the beginning, the route that proposed of D5 passing with an underground connection at Kitay-Gorod station from Yaroslavskiy Railway Terminal to Paveletskaya was decided as the final one.

Stations

References 

Moscow Railway
Railway lines in Russia